Bayabas may refer to:

 The common name for the guava in the Philippines 
 Bayabas, Surigao del Sur